The 2012 NBA Summer League was a pro basketball league run by the NBA just after the 2012 NBA Draft. It took place in Orlando, Florida from July 9 to 13 and in Las Vegas, Nevada from July 13 to 22, 2012. Damian Lillard (Portland Trail Blazers) and Josh Selby (Memphis Grizzlies) won the MVP honors.

Players
A list of players who participated can be viewed here

Orlando Summer League

Teams
The following is a list of teams that participated in the Orlando Summer League
Boston Celtics	
Detroit Pistons	
Oklahoma City Thunder	
Utah Jazz	
Indiana Pacers	
Orlando Magic	
Brooklyn Nets	
Philadelphia 76ers

Boxscores and recaps of each game can be viewed here

July 9 scores
Orlando Magic beat Brooklyn Nets, 92-88
Boston Celtics beat Oklahoma City Thunder, 73-65
Detroit Pistons beat Utah Jazz, 76-73
Indiana Pacers beat Philadelphia 76ers, 69-63

July 10 scores
Utah Jazz beat Philadelphia 76ers, 84-80
Indiana Pacers beat Oklahoma City Thunder, 78-74
Detroit Pistons beat Orlando Magic, 79-74	
Boston Celtics beat Brooklyn Nets, 82-73

July 11 scores
Boston Celtics beat Indiana Pacers, 85-77
Oklahoma City Thunder beat Detroit Pistons, 83-62	
Philadelphia 76ers beat Brooklyn Nets, 79-71
Utah Jazz beat Orlando Magic, 79-75

July 12 scores
Detroit Pistons beat Boston Celtics, 93-79	
Oklahoma City Thunder beat Brooklyn Nets, 87-86
Utah Jazz beat Indiana Pacers, 87-81
Orlando Magic beat Philadelphia 76ers, 77-75

July 13 scores
Utah Jazz beat Oklahoma City Thunder, 89-75
Boston Celtics beat Orlando Magic, 94-73
Detroit Pistons beat Philadelphia 76ers, 71-67
Brooklyn Nets beat Indiana Pacers, 90-77

Orlando games standings

Las Vegas Summer League

Box scores and recaps for each game can be viewed here

Teams

The following is a list of teams that participated in the Las Vegas Summer League.
Golden State Warriors
Charlotte Bobcats
Dallas Mavericks
Houston Rockets
Milwaukee Bucks
Minnesota Timberwolves
Portland Trail Blazers
Cleveland Cavaliers 
Miami Heat 
Washington Wizards 
NBA D-League Select 
Atlanta Hawks 
Boston Celtics
Los Angeles Clippers
Memphis Grizzlies 
Phoenix Suns 
Sacramento Kings 
San Antonio Spurs 
Toronto Raptors 
Chicago Bulls 
Denver Nuggets 
Los Angeles Lakers 
New Orleans Hornets 
New York Knicks

July 13 scores

July 14 scores

July 15 scores

July 16 scores

July 17 scores

July 18 scores

July 19 scores

July 20 scores

July 21 scores

July 22 scores

Las Vegas standings

League leaders
The league leaders' stats include stats for Orlando and Las Vegas summer leagues.

Points

Rebounds

Assists

References

External links
Official Site

2012
2012–13 NBA season
Summer League
2012 in sports in Florida
2012 in sports in Nevada
Basketball in Las Vegas